Cycling at the 2011 All-Africa Games in Maputo, Mozambique was held between September 5–7, 2011.

Medal summary

Men

Women

Medal table

References

External links
 Cycling All Africa Games Maputo 2011 - todor66.com

2011 All-Africa Games
All-Africa Games
Cycling at the African Games